Irene Duhart Long (November 16, 1950 – August 4, 2020) was an American physician and was an official at the U.S. National Aeronautics and Space Administration. She was the first female chief medical officer at the Kennedy Space Center.

Early life and education 
Long, the second of two children was born to Andrew and Heloweise Davis Duhart  in Cleveland, Ohio.  She graduated from East High School in Cleveland, and in 1973, she received her Bachelor's degree in Biology from Northwestern University. In 1977, Long received her medical degree from the Saint Louis University School of Medicine followed by residencies at the Cleveland Clinic, Mt. Sinai Hospital in Cleveland, Ohio, and Wright State University in Dayton, Ohio, as the second civilian to enter the Wright State University School of Medicine’s aerospace medicine program, and where she received her Masters of Science degree in aerospace medicine.

Career 
In 1982 Long went to work for NASA as a physician. There, she contributed to the creation of the Spaceflight and Life Sciences Training Program. Notably, she was the medical officer on duty Jan. 28, 1986, the day of the space shuttle Challenger disaster. In 1994, she was appointed director of the Biomedical Operations and Research Office at the Kennedy Space Center.  In 2000, she was appointed as Chief Medical Officer and Associate Director of Spaceport Services at the Kennedy Space Center. She retired at the age of 63 and David Tipton assumed the duties as Chief Medical Officer in 2013. She worked for NASA for 31 years.

Awards

1986 - Kennedy Space Center Federal Woman of the Year Award 
1995 - Society of NASA Flight Surgeons Presidential Award 
1998 - Women in Aerospace Outstanding Achievement Award 
2001 - Ohio Women's Hall of Fame
2005 - Lifetime Achievement Award, Women of Color Technology Awards Conference
2010 - Strughold Award, Space Medicine Association

Notes

References
 Staff (January 2004) "Irene D. Long 1951-" Biography Today 13(1):  pp. 92–104
 
 
 
 

1950 births
2020 deaths
Physicians from Cleveland
Northwestern University alumni
Saint Louis University alumni
Wright State University alumni
NASA people